is a Japanese manga series written by Kazutaka and illustrated by Kai Tomohiro. It was serialized on Kodansha's Magazine Pocket online magazine from February 2018 to April 2020, with its chapters collected in eight tankōbon volumes. A sequel, also titled Destiny Lovers, began on Magazine Pocket in April 2020. In North America, the manga has been licensed for English language release by Seven Seas Entertainment.

Premise 
High school student Kosuke Fujishiro is abducted and put into a prison run by women who intend to take away his virginity. However, Kosuke refuses, as he has pledged to be faithful to his childhood friend Sayaka. He and the other men there must survive by not giving into the seductions and temptations, or they will be killed. To further complicate things, the person in charge of the seduction team is Sayaka, who tells Kosuke to keep resisting.

Publication
Destiny Lovers is written by Kazutaka and illustrated Kai Tomohiro. It was serialized on Kodansha's Magazine Pocket online magazine from February 10, 2018, to April 18, 2020. Kodansha collected its chapters in eight tankōbon volumes, released from June 8, 2018, to August 5, 2020.

In North America, the manga is licensed for English language release by Seven Seas Entertainment, being published under its Ghost Ship imprint for mature readers.

A sequel, also titled Destiny Lovers but written , began on Magazine Pocket on April 18, 2020. It serves as the original manga's last arc. Kodansha released the first tankōbon volume on August 5, 2020. As of March 4, 2022, eight volumes have been released.

Volume list

1st series

2nd series

References

External links
 
 

Erotic thriller anime and manga
Japanese webcomics
Kodansha manga
Mystery anime and manga
Shōnen manga
Webcomics in print